The Chicago Transit Authority (CTA) operates three separate stations on its rapid transit service that are referred to as "Chicago", as they are located on or near Chicago Avenue.  Chicago (CTA) may refer to:

 Chicago/State
 Chicago/Milwaukee
 Chicago/Franklin

See also
 Chicago (disambiguation)